Martin Vickerton (born 24 June 1987) is an English footballer who played in The Football League for Nottingham Forest. He progressed through the highly respected Nottignham Forest Academy and was awarded a youth team scholarship. His appearances in professional football came during the 2005–06 season against MK Dons and Woking FC. In 2006, Vickerton moved to Virginia, USA on a full scholarship. He was a regular starter for Longwood University. From 2007 to 2009, Vickerton played for the Ottawa Fury. He also played professional indoor soccer in 2010 and 2011. He is currently the Club Director for the Tidewater Sharks, a National Premier League youth team in Williamsburg, VA.

He also represented Great Britain in 2007, at the World University Games in Bangkok, Thailand, and scored against Morocco. After college he served as Assistant Men's Soccer coach at West Virginia Wesleyan college whilst completing his MBA. He holds an English Football Association Level 2 License, NSCAA Level 5 and 6, USSF D License (acquiring C License - Summer 2017) and NCSAA Club Development Diploma. His friends call him Vicky, and he is respected as one of the best youth coaches in Virginia.

References

English footballers
Nottingham Forest F.C. players
English Football League players
1987 births
Living people
Association football defenders
Longwood Lancers men's soccer players
English expatriate footballers
Expatriate soccer players in the United States
West Virginia Wesleyan Bobcats soccer
College men's soccer coaches in the United States